First-class cricket, along with List A cricket and Twenty20 cricket, is one of the highest-standard forms of cricket. A first-class match is one of three or more days' scheduled duration between two sides of eleven players each and is officially adjudged to be worthy of the status by virtue of the standard of the competing teams. Matches must allow for the teams to play two innings each, although in practice a team might play only one innings or none at all.

The etymology of "first-class cricket" is unknown, but it was used loosely before it acquired official status in 1895, following a meeting of leading English clubs. At a meeting of the Imperial Cricket Conference (ICC) in 1947, it was formally defined on a global basis. A significant omission of the ICC ruling was any attempt to define first-class cricket retrospectively. That has left historians, and especially statisticians, with the problem of how to categorise earlier matches, especially those played in Great Britain before 1895. The Association of Cricket Statisticians and Historians (ACS) has published a list of early matches which are believed to have been of a high standard.

Test cricket, the highest standard of cricket, is statistically a form of first-class cricket, though the term "first-class" is mainly used to refer to domestic competition. A player's first-class statistics include any performances in Test matches.

Initial usage under MCC ruling, May 1894
Before 1894 "first-class" was a common adjective applied to cricket matches in England, used loosely to suggest that a match had a high standard; adjectives like "great", "important" and "major" were also loosely applied to such matches, but there tended to be differences of opinion. In the inaugural issue of Cricket: A Weekly Record of the Game on 10 May 1882, the term is used twice on page 2 in reference to the recently completed tour of Australia and New Zealand by Alfred Shaw's XI. The report says it is "taking" the first-class matches to be one against Sydney (sic), two each against Victoria, the Combined team and the Australian Eleven, and another against South Australia. In the fourth issue on 1 June 1882, James Lillywhite refers to first-class matches on the tour but gives a different list.

The earliest known match scorecards date from 1744 but few have been found before 1772. The cards for three 1772 matches have survived and scorecards became increasingly common thereafter. At the beginning of the 1860s, there were only four formally constituted county clubs. Sussex was the oldest, formed in 1839, and it had been followed by Kent, Nottinghamshire and Surrey. In the early 1860s, several more county clubs were founded, and questions began to be raised in the sporting press about which should be categorised as first-class, but there was considerable disagreement in the answers. In 1880, the Cricket Reporting Agency was founded. It acquired influence through the decade especially by association with Wisden Cricketers' Almanack (Wisden) and the press came to generally rely on its information and opinions.

The term acquired official status, though limited to matches in Great Britain, following a meeting at Lord's in May 1894 between the Marylebone Cricket Club (MCC) committee and the secretaries of the clubs involved in the official County Championship, which had begun in 1890. As a result, those clubs became first-class from 1895 along with MCC, Cambridge University, Oxford University, senior cricket touring teams (i.e., Australia and South Africa at that time) and other teams designated as such by MCC (e.g., North v South, Gentlemen v Players and occasional "elevens" which consisted of recognised first-class players). Officially, therefore, the inaugural first-class match was the opening game of the 1895 season between MCC and Nottinghamshire at Lord's on 1 and 2 May, MCC winning by 37 runs.

"Test match" was another loosely applied term at the time but the first list of matches considered to be "Tests" was conceived and published by South Australian journalist Clarence P. Moody in his 1894 book, Australian Cricket and Cricketers, 1856 to 1893–94. His proposal was widely accepted after a list of 39 matches was reproduced in the 28 December 1894 issue of Cricket magazine. The list began with the Melbourne Cricket Ground match played 15–17 March 1877 and ended with a recent match at the Association Ground, Sydney played 14–20 December 1894. All of Moody's matches, plus four additional ones, were retrospectively recognised as Test matches and also, thereby, as first-class matches.

Formal definition under ICC ruling, May 1947
The term "first-class cricket" was formally defined by the then Imperial Cricket Conference (ICC) on 19 May 1947. It was made clear that the definition "will not have retrospective effect". The definition is as follows:

A match of three or more days' duration between two sides of eleven players officially adjudged first-class, shall be regarded as a first-class fixture. Matches in which either team have more than eleven players or which are scheduled for less than three days shall not be regarded as first-class. The Governing body in each country shall decide the status of teams.

For example, MCC was authorised to determine the status of matches played in Great Britain. To all intents and purposes, the 1947 ICC definition confirmed the 1894 MCC definition, and gave it international recognition and usage.

Hence, official judgment of status is the responsibility of the governing body in each country that is a full member of the International Cricket Council (ICC). The governing body grants first-class status to international teams and to domestic teams that are representative of the country's highest playing standard. Later ICC rulings make it possible for international teams from associate members of the ICC to achieve first-class status but it is dependent on the status of their opponents in a given match.

Definition
According to the ICC definition, a match may be adjudged first-class if:
 it is of three or more days scheduled duration
 each side playing the match has eleven players
 each side may have two innings
 the match is played on natural, and not artificial, turf
 the match is played at a venue which meets certain standard criteria regarding venues
 the match conforms to the Laws of Cricket, except for only minor amendments 
 the sport's governing body in the appropriate nation, or the ICC itself, recognises the match as first-class.

A Test match is a first-class match played between two ICC full member countries, subject to their current status at the ICC and the application of ICC conditions when the match is played.

Recognised matches
In 2010, the ICC published its Classification of Official Cricket which includes the criteria with which a match must comply to achieve a desired categorisation. In the section on first-class cricket, there is a list of the types of match that should qualify. It is important to note, given the differences in opinion about what constitutes a first-class match, that the ICC clearly stipulates that its match type list "is not exhaustive and is merely indicative of the matches which would fall into the first-class definition". For example, the list includes matches of recognised first-class teams versus international touring teams; and the leading domestic championships (using their then-current names) such as the County Championship, Sheffield Shield, Ranji Trophy, etc.

Examples of first-class domestic competitions

Current active men's competitions

Retrospective classification of matches played before the definitions
The absence of any ICC ruling about matches played before 1947 (or before 1895 in Great Britain) is problematic for those cricket statisticians who wish to categorise earlier matches in the same way. They have responded by compiling their own match lists and allocating a strictly unofficial first-class status to the matches they consider to have been of a high standard. It is therefore a matter of opinion only with no official support. Inevitable differences have arisen and there are variations in published cricket statistics. In November 2021, the ICC retrospectively applied first-class status to women's cricket, aligning it with the men's game.

Issue for statisticians
A key issue for the statisticians is when first-class cricket for their purpose is deemed to have begun. Writing in 1951, Roy Webber argued that the majority of matches prior to 1864 (i.e., the year in which overarm bowling was legalised) "cannot be regarded as first-class" and their records are used "for their historical associations". This drew a line between what was important historically and what should form part of the statistical record. Hence, for pre-1895 (i.e., in Great Britain) cricket matches, "first-class" is essentially a statistical concept while the historical concept is broader and takes account of historical significance. Webber's rationale was that cricket was "generally weak before 1864" (there was a greater and increasingly more organised effort to promote county cricket from about that time) and match details were largely incomplete, especially bowling analyses, which hindered compilation of records. According to Webber's view, the inaugural first-class match was the opening game of the 1864 season between Cambridge University and MCC at Fenner's on 12 and 13 May, Cambridge winning by 6 wickets.

Important matches list
When the Association of Cricket Statisticians and Historians (ACS) published its Guide to First-Class Cricket Matches Played in the British Isles in 1982, it tentatively agreed with Webber's 1864 start date by saying that "the line between first-class and other matches becomes more easily discernible about that date". A year earlier, the ACS had published its Guide to Important Cricket Matches Played in the British Isles, 1709–1863 in which it listed all the known matches during that period which it considered to have historical importance. The ACS did stipulate that they had taken a more lenient view of importance regarding matches played in the 18th century than they did of matches played in the 19th century. As they explained, surviving details of 18th century matches are typically incomplete while there is a fairly comprehensive store of data about 19th century matches, certainly since 1825.

Earlier startpoints suggested
Subsequently, Webber's view was challenged by Bill Frindall who believed that 1815 should be the startpoint to encompass the entire roundarm bowling phase of cricket's history, although roundarm did not begin in earnest until 1827. In Frindall's view, the inaugural first-class match should have been the opening game of the 1815 season between MCC and Middlesex at Lord's on 31 May and 1 June, Middlesex winning by 16 runs. Notwithstanding Frindall's reputation, Webber's view has been revived and reinforced in recent times. For example, the ACS researchers Derek Carlaw and John Winnifrith begin their 2020 study of Kent cricketers since 1806 by stating: "Part One is confined to players who appeared for Kent in important matches from 1806 to 1863 and first-class matches from 1864 to 1914".

On the internet, the CricketArchive (CA) and ESPN Cricinfo (CI) databases both say the earliest first-class match was Hampshire v England at Broadhalfpenny Down on 24 and 25 June 1772. At that time, cricket matches were played with a two-stump wicket and exclusively underarm bowling, although other features of the modern game had been introduced. The opinion of these databases has been repudiated by both Wisden and Playfair Cricket Annual. Wisden agrees with Frindall by commencing its first-class records in 1815. Playfair supports Webber and begins its records in 1864. 

The status of earlier matches, including many in the ACS' Important Matches guide, which have left no scorecard and for which only a brief announcement or report exists, must be based on other factors. Contemporary importance was often measured by the amount of money at stake and the fact that a match was deemed notable enough to be reported in the press. The 18th century matches in the ACS list were primarily compiled to assist historians. The earliest match known to have been accorded superior status in a contemporary report (i.e., termed "a great match" in this case) and to have been played for a large sum of money was one in Sussex between two unnamed eleven-a-side teams contesting "fifty guineas apiece" in June 1697, a match of enormous historical significance but with no statistical data recorded.

See also
 List of first-class cricket records
 Lists of cricket records

References

Bibliography
 
 
 
 
 
 
 
 
 
 
 
 
 

 
Cricket terminology